Donald Haines (May 9, 1919 – February 20, 1943) was an American child actor who had recurring appearances in the Our Gang short subjects series from 1930 to 1933. He appeared in Our Gang during the early sound days along with Norman "Chubby" Chaney, Allen "Farina" Hoskins, Jackie Cooper, Matthew "Stymie" Beard, Bobby "Wheezer" Hutchins, and Dorothy DeBorba.

Early years
Haines was born in Seward County, Nebraska, the son of Karl and Nola Haines. Their family moved to California when he was 9 years old.

Our Gang
Haines's tenure began during the early talkies up through the "Miss Crabtree episodes," and then the early Spanky episodes. He would leave with Jackie Cooper for feature films at Paramount only to return a few months later. He was 11 years old when he joined the gang in 1930. His association with the Our Gang series lasted through 1933.

Haines's first short was Shivering Shakespeare, which featured him giggling his way through his lines. He was intended to originally be a full-time character playing the tough guy and was cast as such in The First Seven Years, opposite Jackie Cooper. After that, he played a recurring character with occasional lines of dialogue until 1931. At that time he was offered a contract with Paramount that began with a role in a feature called Skippy. Cooper also was offered a role on that feature along with a contract. Both Jackie and Donald are missing from the final scenes of the second-to-last short made in the 1930-31 season, Bargain Day, owing to their beginning work at Paramount.

Haines left Paramount to return to Hal Roach Studios just in time for the 1931-32 season. Haines would resume his role as a recurring character with occasional dialogue for the next two seasons. Haines left the Our Gang series at the age of 15 after appearing in the 1933 short Fish Hooky.

Later career
Haines left the Our Gang series in 1933 but continued working as an actor at Hal Roach Studios on many shorts and features until 1940. His work during this time included appearances in the East Side Kids films East Side Kids and Boys of the City as "Pee Wee" and then in That Gang of Mine, Pride of the Bowery, Flying Wild, Bowery Blitzkrieg, and Spooks Run Wild as "Skinny." He also played Jerry Cruncher Jr. in the film version of A Tale of Two Cities.

Death
Haines enlisted as an aviation cadet in the United States Army Air Forces on December 10, 1941, to serve in World War II. He was killed in action on February 20, 1943, in North Africa. At the time of his death, his rank was first lieutenant. Haines is buried in Inglewood Park Cemetery in Los Angeles.

Filmography

Our Gang
Shivering Shakespeare (1930, Short) as Donny  (film debut)
The First Seven Years (1930, Short) as Speck (uncredited)
Teacher's Pet (1930, Short) as Don (uncredited)
School's Out (1930, Short) as himself
Helping Grandma (1931, Short) as Donald
Love Business (1931, Short) as Donald
Little Daddy (1931, Short) as Donald
Bargain Day (1931, Short) as Donald
Big Ears (1931, Short) as Donald
Readin' and Writin' (1932, Short) as Donald
Free Eats (1932, Short) as Kid Wanting Cake
Choo-Choo! (1932, Short) as Donald, an orphan
Birthday Blues (1932, Short) as Boy with mousetrap on lip
A Lad an' a Lamp (1932, Short) as Toughie
Fish Hooky (1933, Short) as Donald

Film

Skippy (1931) as Harley Nubbins
When a Feller Needs a Friend (1932) as Fatty Bullen
No Greater Glory (1934) as Csonakos
Manhattan Melodrama (1934) as Spud - as a Boy (uncredited)
Little Man, What Now? (1934) as Emil Kleinholz Jr.
Now I'll Tell (1934) as Messenger Boy (uncredited)
Murder in the Private Car (1934) as Boy in Front of Theatre (uncredited)
Kid Millions (1934) as Kid Band Member (uncredited)
I'll Fix It (1934) as Boy (uncredited)
Music in the Air (1934) as Peanut Vendor at Munich Zoo (uncredited)
The Winning Ticket (1935) as Stubby (uncredited)
Straight from the Heart (1935) as Neighbor Boy (uncredited)
Vagabond Lady (1935) as Spear Office Boy (uncredited)
Ginger (1935) as Butch (uncredited)
The Nitwits (1935) as Hal - Office Boy (uncredited)
His Night Out (1935) as Office Boy (uncredited)
Annie Oakley (1935) as Boy at Shooting Gallery (uncredited)
A Tale of Two Cities (1935) as Jerry Cruncher Jr.
Exclusive Story (1936) as Office Boy (uncredited)
Little Lord Fauntleroy (1936) as Fighting Boy (uncredited)
Love Before Breakfast (1936) as Boy on Bicycle (uncredited)
Little Miss Nobody (1936) as Harold Slade
Bunker Bean (1936) as Jones & Co. Office Boy (uncredited)
Daniel Boone (1936) as man Being Burned at The Stake (uncredited)
Two Wise Maids (1937) as Schoolboy (uncredited)
Rhythm in the Clouds (1937) as Office Boy (uncredited)
Public Wedding (1937) as Boy Selling Confetti (uncredited)
Super-Sleuth (1937) as Second Newsboy (uncredited)
Love and Hisses (1937) as Newsboy (uncredited)
Kidnapped (1938) as Ransome
Three Comrades (1938) as Jupp - Boy Running for Help (uncredited)
Reformatory (1938) as Inmate (uncredited)
Boys Town (1938) as Alabama (uncredited)
Down on the Farm (1938) as Boy in Drug Store (uncredited)
Sergeant Madden (1939) as Milton
Never Say Die (1939) as Julius - Bellhop (uncredited)
On Your Toes (1939) as Elevator Operator (uncredited)
East Side Kids (1940) as PeeWee
Seventeen (1940) as Joe Bullitt
The Return of Wild Bill (1940) as Bobby
Boys of the City (1940) as Peewee
That Gang of Mine (1940) as Skinny
Fugitive from a Prison Camp (1940) as Burly Bascomb
Melody Ranch (1940) as Callboy (uncredited)
Pride of the Bowery (1940) as Skinny
Flying Wild (1941) as Skinny
Bowery Blitzkrieg (1941) as Skinny
Spooks Run Wild (1941) as Skinny (final film)

References

Bibliography
 Holmstrom, John. The Moving Picture Boy: An International Encyclopaedia from 1895 to 1995, Norwich, Michael Russell, 1996, p. 89.

External links

 

American male child actors
1919 births
1943 deaths
United States Army Air Forces personnel killed in World War II
People from Sumner County, Kansas
Male actors from Kansas
20th-century American male actors
People from Seward County, Nebraska
American male comedy actors
Our Gang
American male film actors
Hal Roach Studios actors
United States Army Air Forces officers